William Hayes may refer to:

In politics
William Hayes (Irish politician), Irish Sinn Féin politician 
William Hayes (Canadian politician) (1879–1939), member of the Legislative Assembly of Alberta
William P. Hayes (1866–1940), American lawyer and mayor of Springfield, Massachusetts

In sport
William Hayes (American football) (born 1985), American football player
William Hayes (Australian cricketer) (1883–1926), Australian cricketer
William Hayes (New Zealand cricketer) (1890-1972), New Zealand cricketer
William Hayes (diver) (born 1968), Canadian Olympic diver
William Hayes (rugby league), rugby league footballer of the 1930s and 1940s
William Hayes (wrestler) (1891–?), British wrestler
Willie Hayes (basketball) (born 1967), American college basketball head coach
Willie Hayes (1928–2014), Irish footballer
Will Hayes (footballer) (born 1995), Australian footballer

Other people
William Hayes (composer) (1708–1777), organist, conductor, writer
William Hayes (geneticist) (1913–1994), Irish-born microbiologist and geneticist
William Hayes (pastoralist) (1827–1913), Australian pastoralist
William Hayes (photographer) (1871–1940), Victorian photographer in York, England
William C. Hayes (1903–1963), American Egyptologist
William Prine Hayes (1919–2009), Canadian commodore and educator
William Q. Hayes (born 1956), U.S. federal judge
William Hayes (academic) (born 1930), president of St John's College, Oxford
Billy Hayes (writer) (born 1947), American writer
Bully Hayes (William Henry Hayes, 1827/29–1877), American ship's captain and trader

See also
William Haye (1948–2019), Jamaican cricketer
Billy Hayes (disambiguation)
William Hays (disambiguation)
William Hay (disambiguation)